Daboya is the capital of the North Gonja district, a district in the Savannah Region of north Ghana. Daboya is represented by the Daboya-Mankarigu constituency.It is a historical place in Ghana. There is an Army Special Operations Training (SOT) School at Daboya

Notable people
 

Abu Seidu (born 1987), footballer

References

Populated places in the Savannah Region (Ghana)